Fort Boyard is a French game show created by Jacques Antoine that was first broadcast on 7 July 1990 (originally as Les Clés de Fort Boyard, however shortened to Fort Boyard from the second series in 1991). Foreign versions of the show, with varying success, have aired around the world since 1990.

Set and filmed on the real fortress of the same name on the west coast of France, the programme appears similar to British game show The Crystal Maze which was created as an alternative format by Antoine for Channel 4 in the United Kingdom, after the fortress was unavailable to film in because of its then ongoing refurbishment (during 1989). In both programmes the contestants have to complete challenges to win prize money. However, while The Crystal Maze varies the type of games quite considerably, Fort Boyard tends to focus mainly on physical and endurance challenges. Although Fort Boyard was something of a pioneer in the area of game show fear and adventure, later programmes such as Fear Factor have pushed things even further, requiring Fort Boyard to react and adapt with new twists and games, including a couple of seasons in which the contestants spent the night in the Fort (this was particularly popular in the French and Russian versions).

Fort Boyard is the most exported French TV format and the fourth most exported adventure-style game show format in the world after Wipeout, Fear Factor and Survivor. In 2019, a spin-off called  was launched.

Background and history

Creation

In 1980, a co-presenter of Antenne 2's  (the original, French version of Treasure Hunt), came close to drowning while trying to reach Fort Boyard in rough seas. He remained stuck for 3 hours before being rescued by helicopter. This episode inspired Jacques Antoine (creator of La Chasse aux Trésors) in the creation of the TV game show Fort Boyard.

The concept of Fort Boyard was imagined and outlined in 1986, at a meeting in the company of Antoine to find a game show to succeed Treasure Hunt. The idea of a team game show, adapted from role-playing games such as Dungeons & Dragons, taking place in a mysterious tower populated by extraordinary characters, whose goal is to find a treasure, takes shape in the following years.

Whilst looking for a set, a production team visited Fort Boyard in April 1987 and this fortification, located between the Île-d'Aix and the île d'Oléron in the Pertuis d'Antioche strait, was bought in November 1988 for one and a half million francs. The production company resold the fort to the department of Charente-Maritime for a symbolic franc, resulting in the local authority then having to take charge of all the refurbishment works, which took place from July 1989, and ensured the exclusive use of the site to Antoine's production company. Because of the weather conditions, the construction of the sets for the show was done in two stages: between the start of the renovation and October 1989 then the following spring, and were completed shortly before the first day of filming on 30 June 1990. The original French version, under the name Les Clés de Fort Boyard (English: The Keys of Fort Boyard), began airing on 7 July 1990 hosted by Patrice Laffont and originally Marie Talon, later Sophie Davant, on Antenne 2.

1989–90: Sale of concept in UK
The first country to buy the game show Fort Boyard (then known as Les Clés de Fort Boyard) was the United Kingdom and broadcaster Channel 4. After discussions with the French producers, production company Chatsworth Television (at the time producers of Channel 4's Treasure Hunt and ITV's Interceptor, both also game shows created by Antoine) decided to devise a British version and began work on making a concept. According to host Richard O'Brien, the original outlined concept was "kind of like Dungeons and Dragons", with the presenter acting as "Dungeon Master".

Filming of pilot show in London
A non-televised pilot of the show funded by Channel 4 was filmed in a London studio with O'Brien as presenter, as the fort was not available at the time due to its ongoing renovations. Footage of O'Brien's pilot, showing the initial idea for the "Treasure Room" segment of the format, later appears in a casting call advert for the French version, broadcast in May 1990. More footage of the pilot, including the basic set design and some key games (most of which would go on to appear in the series), is featured in Fort Boyard : toujours plus fort! following the first episode of the 30th French season on 22 June 2019. According to co-creator Mitercey in 2009, the pilot was filmed in February 1989 at Elstree Studios. Six English contestants took part. To be as close as possible to reality, a quarter of the Fortress had been built in the studio using metal structures with 18 cells installed for playing games, which were all tested for the first time. Tigers were also present in the recording, as well as a large statue of Sphinx which posed puzzles (this idea was slightly revised later, with the creation of the Father Fouras character in the watchtower) and some characters like the wrestler. According to O'Brien, the recording of the pilot cost 2 million francs (around €304,900), a record at the time. In June 2022, an out of sync twenty-minute edit of the pilot was uploaded on social media by Pierre Launay.

It is said that the considerable changes that Channel 4 wanted to make to the format could not be possible on the Fort, as each broadcaster producing their own version at the time had to strictly follow the French format. Chatsworth were also required by the French producers, but declined, to film their version first in November 1989. As Channel 4 had commissioned the show for a full series, producer Malcolm Heyworth contacted Fort Boyards creator Jacques Antoine about developing an alternative format, with a proposal that it used thematic zones as a means of keeping the show visually fresh. The concept of The Crystal Maze was developed in just "two days", creating a game that, although similar to Fort Boyard, is substantially different in terms of presentation and style. Channel 4's The Crystal Maze first aired on 15 February 1990, five months before the French series.

Later UK versions
Channel 5 later bought the rights to Fort Boyard and made their own British version, using the now refurbished set, which aired from 16 October 1998 to 29 December 2001 for four series. It was produced by Paul Kirrage and executive produced by Richard Holloway, later known for producing The X Factor and other high-profile shows on UK television, for Grundy Productions (later Thames Television in 2001). Although pulling in reasonable ratings for the channel, in March 2002 it was announced that Channel 5 had cancelled the show as part of a station revamp.

It was briefly revived by Challenge in 2003 for one series, with a ten-part documentary, Fort Boyard: Takes On The World, broadcast in October 2004. Fort Boyard later returned to UK television in January 2012 under a new format aired on children's channel CITV, Fort Boyard: Ultimate Challenge. This version ended in December 2014 after five series, the first two of which were co-produced with Disney XD in the United States.

Cast
UK cast
In the UK, two sets of presenters have been used for Fort Boyard. The first set appeared during the first four series of the show, which were broadcast by Channel 5, with the second appearing in the 2003 Challenge-aired fifth series. The leading presenters of Fort Boyard on Channel 5 and Challenge were Melinda Messenger (series 1–4) and Jodie Penfold (series 5). Their roles were to give advice and support for the teams, commentate for the viewers, and match wits with Boyard, the "Master of the Fort".

The other characters in Fort Boyard are:Boyard (played by Leslie Grantham in series 1–4, Christopher Ellison in series 5) is the "Master of the Fort", who sets the challenges that the team must complete to win. In the UK versions of the show, he is portrayed as a selfish, commanding, and malevolent character who takes great pleasure in ensuring that fear and failure plague the contestants. Grantham portrayed these traits slightly more strongly, with Ellison sometimes showing sympathy, or even being generous to the contestants.The Professor (Geoffrey Bayldon, series 1–4) is an eccentric scientist who has become mad over the years as a result of being kept prisoner by Boyard in the 'Watch Tower'. His task is to ask the contestants riddles, which, if answered correctly, will give the team a key or clue word. If they do not answer it correctly, he would throw the key into the sea. Along with Captain Baker, he also talks to the contestants briefly before asking the riddles and to the viewers.Captain Baker (Tom Baker, series 5), the replacement for The Professor, is an insane sea captain held captive by Boyard. He would also reveal the code word at the end of each episode of the fifth series.

Fort Boyard cast

There is also the resident Fort Boyard cast, who first appeared in the French version, and were subsequently featured in most of the other international formats, including the original UK versions, however these were all excluded for Fort Boyard: Ultimate Challenge:Jacques (1990–) and Jules (1990–2009) (André Bouchet and Alain Prévost respectively) are two dwarves who lead the team through the Fort to the next challenge. Denis (Anthony Laborde) later in the show replaces Jules, who retired in 2010. Deni has appeared in the foreign versions since 2000 (replacing Jules) and from 2004 in the French series. The three are called Passe-Partout, Passe-Temps, and Passe-Muraille respectively in the French version. Jacques (Passe-Partout) is also responsible for locking the contestants in the cells of the Fort if they fail to get out within the time limit; whilst Jules (Passe-Temps), in later series, Deni (Passe-Muraille) takes contestants to the Watch Tower. In duel versions, Deni plays the same role of Jacques. This is because two teams are playing at the same time.Monique (1991–1997, 1999–2005, 2007–) (Monique Angeon) turns a statue shaped as a tiger's head to release the gold or close the gate in the 'Treasure Room'. She is called Felindra in the French & Lebanese versions and was absent in 1998 and in 2006, replaced by Kareen Le Portier (Thierry's daughter). In 1998, the unnamed Tiger Master (Thierry Le Portier) performs this role. He is called Major in the French version. In February 2022, it was announced that the tigers would retire from the Fort, meaning the role would no longer be required from that year onwards.La Boule (1994–2013) (Yves Marchesseau, 1952–2014) sounds the "gong" to indicate the start and end of time and locks the contestants in cages when they fail to get out of challenge rooms in time. La Boule is a whaler, who has possibly found refuge in the Fort. He left the show in May 2014 for health reasons. Marchesseau died of oesophageal cancer and diabetes in September 2014 at the age of 62. Since leaving Felindra, the tiger tamer, handles the sound the gong (then inside the Treasure Room) with her whip until this role was taken over by a new character, Big Boo, starting in 2020.  Mr Boo (2011–2019) and Lady Boo (2011–) the two wrestlers. Mr Boo has replaced La Boule since 2014 by taking prisoners to the dungeon, the role was later taken over by Big Boo in 2020.

As of 2014, there have been 41 characters in the French version. Most appeared in various games on the fort.

Famous contestants

French series
Since 1993, teams on the French version of the show consist entirely of celebrities. These include: cyclist Laurent Fignon, Formula 1 driver Romain Grosjean in 2019, figure skating champion Brian Joubert (appearing in 2004, 2007, 2008 and 2012), Djibril Cissé, Omar Sy, R&B singer Leslie (in 2002, 2003 and 2013), Tony Parker and Eva Longoria in 2009, and many others. Many former/new hosts of the show have often appeared as contestants.

In 1997, a series of boybands would be featured. These include 2Be3 & Worlds Apart.

However, in 2010 the formula was dramatically changed and the squads, of four members each, did not consist of any celebrities. The "duel" format was used that year. The celebrities returned in 2011 playing for charity. In 2019 French World Cup winning footballer Adil Rami was sacked by Olympique de Marseille for reportedly missing training to appear on the show.

UK series
On 26 December 1999, a celebrity edition of Fort Boyard was broadcast, featuring, Frank Bruno, Samuel Kane, Glenda McKay, Gabby Logan and Sharron Davies as contestants. As a one-off, the show's length was extended to 80 minutes so that the team had to get five keys (instead of four) and the code word in fifty-five minutes. Frank captained the team and won £7,910 for their nominated charity.

Series 3 aired two celebrity editions of Fort Boyard following the success of the 1999 special; broadcast on 5 January and 25 August 2001, one edition featured Rhodri Williams, Lisa Rogers, "Handy" Andy Kane, Tricia Penrose and Phil Gayle as the contestants. Rhodri was the team captain and the team won £14,350 for charity. The other featured Anna Walker, Victor Ubogu, Annalise Braakensiek, Tim Vincent and Troy Titus-Adams. Anna Walker captained the team and they won £7,190 for charity.

Another celebrity edition aired at the end of series four (episode 14) in 2001 featuring Sally Gray, Scott Wright, Nell McAndrew, Keith Duffy and Tris Payne. Sally Gray was the team captain and the team won £10,130 for charity. Episode 4 of series 4, broadcast on 13 October 2001, was a special featuring contestants from the first series of The Mole.

Celebrity editions were also broadcast during the 2003 series by Challenge. It featured Doug Williams, Paul Burchill, Nikita, James Tighe, and Sweet Saraya, all of whom were wrestling stars from British promotion FWA. Doug Williams captained the team and won £190. Other celebrities appearing in series 5 included Tim Vine and Craig Phillips, Big Brother 2000 winner. The team won £1,820 for charity, which was topped up by a further £5,000 because Tim Vine accepted a challenge to tell 10 jokes in one minute.

 Other series 
In most series of the Danish and Swedish versions, teams have consisted entirely of celebrities. In the 2010 and 2012 series of the Finnish version, team members were celebrities. Most (or all) episodes of the Russian series consisted of famous national singers, actors, TV presenters and sportsmen.

In the 2013 Canadian version, the teams consisted of 24 participants in total; 12 celebrities and 12 members of the public, divided into six teams of four equally.

In the Argentine version of the show, aired in 1999 and 2000, a celebrity joined the other 4 people to help them on their challenges. Argentina's was the first version to have a female character guarding the tower: "La Dama del Fuerte" played by Isabel Achaval. This was followed by Germany's Sonya Kraus and Yasemin Kozanoğlu for Turkey both in 2000. On 4 June 2019, Swedish broadcaster TV4 confirmed that Suzanne Reuter would appear in the role as "Madame Fouras".

In the Moroccan version, aired in early 2015 but filmed the previous year, 3 celebrities joined teams with 2 unknown people for the challenges. The first episode of Jazirat Al Kanz aired on 24 February and was watched by 6.4 million viewers, a record 59% audience share for 2MTV.

Fort Boyard around the world

Fort Boyard is a French game show first broadcast in 1990; however the fort is also used by television stations from other countries in order to produce their own (typically modified) versions, using part of the technical teams and characters of the original French show.

Filming takes place during the summer months (May to July, until August in 2000 due to a large number of countries attending) each year. Foreign versions of the show typically last between 22 and 80 minutes per episode, depending on the country and format used. In total, 34 foreign versions have broadcast around the world since 1990.

Following the ratings success of the Moroccan version, an African version is aired in 24 countries of French-speaking Africa since September 2019 on Canal+ Afrique.

Proposed versions and pilots
Italy has only ever made a pilot for Fort Boyard, in 1991. The host of this unaired version was Marco Predolin. The American pilot for ABC, filmed the same year, was eventually broadcast on 20 March 1993.

In December 2005, it was reported that French producers Adventure Line Productions were in final talks with around three Indian broadcasters to bring the format to the country; however in the end this did not happen. In October 2010, it was reported that Brazil and Tunisia had signed on for filming in 2011. However, no series was later produced for either country. In December 2012, Ukrainian channel ICTV announced they were due to film the country's second season of the show. However, for unknown reasons, the filming did not take place. A Chinese version of the show was confirmed to be filmed in mid-September 2015, however it was later cancelled due to censorship worries.

Impacts of the COVID-19 pandemic

In 2020, due to the COVID-19 pandemic, no foreign countries chose to film its own version. Six countries were initially expected to attend that year, including Sweden, Morocco, Russia and Denmark. This marked the first and only year to date in which only the French version was filmed. Sweden, Morocco, Ukraine and the Pan-African versions cancelled filming for 2021 because of the health constraints linked to the pandemic, however, Norway and Poland confirmed that they would return alongside Denmark and Russia.

Special events and spin-offs
The fort has also been used for special private events in 2014, 2016 and 2019 by Russian visitors and filmed non-televised shows featuring children for the French sponsor Prince de LU from 2011 to 2013, with Anne-Gaëlle Riccio returning as host. Further mini-episodes featuring Willy Rovelli's Chef character and eating challenge were filmed in June 2020 and premiered online on the children's on-demand platform Okoo of France Télévisions, and its website france.tv from October 14, 2020. It was confirmed in July 2019 that an unnamed Russian billionaire of a large steel company had hired the Fort three times, firstly in 2014 for a team building session and most recently for his 50th birthday.

International versionsLegend: Original version  
 Currently airing  
 Upcoming season  
 Status unknown  
 No longer airing  

Broadcast syndication
Fort Boyard has aired on many networks around the world. Some countries, such as Portugal, aired the original French version dubbed or with subtitles as opposed to producing their own. Others include:

 Belarus (Russian version on ONT in 2013, VTV since 2019)
 Canada (Mentv aired the UK version, 2005–200?)
 China (Hunan Television)
 Cyprus (Greek version on Sigma TV until mid-2010)
 Indonesia (French version on TV5Monde Asie)
 Jordan (JRTV Channel 2)
 Malaysia (NTV7 aired series 1–2 of the UK version)
 Portugal (French version on RTP1, 1994–1995)
 Slovenia (French version, mid 1990s)
 Venezuela (French and later Spanish version on Venevisión, 2001)

A number of other countries also did this before producing their own versions in later years. These include: 
Azerbaijan (Lider TV aired the Greek and French versions, 2009–2010)
Czech Republic (ČT2 (1992–94), TV Nova (1994–95); Prima Cool since 2012, airs series 3–5 of the UK version and the French version since 2013)
Poland (PTK2 Upper Silesia in 1992; ATV1/ATV Relaks, 1993–99)
Finland (Yle TV1 in 1993)
Romania (TVR1 in 1992; Pro TV, 1995–97)
Russia (Channel One Ostankino in 1992; NTV aired the British, Canadian, French and Norwegian versions, 1994–2000)
Slovakia 
Ukraine

In France, reruns of their own version have aired on Gulli (2006–2014), TV5Monde Europe, 1ère, and France 4 since 6 September 2014. In Belgium, since 2017, French-language broadcaster RTBF acquired rights allowing it to broadcast the show on the eve of its release in France. It was initially aired on La Une but moved to La Deux in 2020. Ukraine (ТЕТ, 2006–2007), Georgia (Rustavi 2, 2010), Slovakia (Dajto, 2013), Algeria (A3), Quebec (Prise 2, 2009–2010), Argentina (Volver, 2019), Lebanon (LBCI, 2020–21) and the UK have also repeated past series on various channels.

Participation table
The year 2000 contains the most episodes filmed of any year (123 for eleven countries, including France). To date (excluding 2020), 2005 has the least (26), with just the French and Greek versions attending. As of 2018, the overall number of episodes filmed is 1,782, of which 327 are of the original French version over 29 seasons. Sweden, is the foreign country which has produced the most episodes to date (222 over 19 seasons).

Format

Fort Boyards format varies from country to country, but the basics are the same. A team of friends enter the Fort with the intention of winning the gold. To do this, the contestants have to successfully complete a series of challenges set by a fort-master,  who wishes to keep the gold to themselves.

The first thing done in the game is the sounding of the Fort's gong by French character 'La Boule'. Once the gong sounds the game time begins ticking down. In the UK version the game lasted for 40 minutes, in the French version 60 to 120 minutes, depending on the year.

The show's original format is outlined in the following sections.

Challenges
The first set of games the contestants have to complete is to win a certain number of keys (in series 1–4 of the UK version four keys were needed, whereas five were need in series 5; five were needed in the Quebec version, and seven in the Swedish and Danish versions.  The current French version requires nine keys). These keys, once won, are used to open the gate to the Treasure Room, a central room in the Fort where the gold is held.

The challenges that are set to win the keys are located in small cells around the Fort, with small water-timers (a Clepsydre) outside to give the contestant a time limit (around 2–3 minutes, depending on the game) to complete it; in the UK version, Boyard would start the timer upon saying to a contestant that "their time starts now", whereas in the 5th series, Boyard would start it after telling Jacques to open the door of a challenge room. If a contestant fails to leave the challenge room before the time runs out, he or she is locked in and then shortly after taken away to a cage (by La Boule or Mr Boo since 2011), meaning they are not allowed to continue with the rest of the key games and must stay there until the end of Phase One. In the UK's 4th series, La Boule would give the contestant a large bunch of rusty keys. One of these keys would unlock the cage allowing the contestant to re-join the team.

During this phase of the game, one contestant goes up to the Watch Tower to win an additional key for the team (see below). This could be done once or twice, depending on the season.

Once the contestants reach the end of Phase One, usually towards the end of their game time, there is a trip to the Treasure Room with all of the keys that they have won so far. If they have enough to unlock the Treasure Room Door then the keys are entered and the gate is unlocked. However, it does not open until later in the show.

If they are short of keys to open the gate then team members are 'sacrificed' for keys, one team member for each key short (one person to win the rest of the extra keys if less than 7 in the French version from 1991-1996). The 'sacrificed' contestants are then placed in an underground cell and locked in. These team members remain for the rest of the game, and are therefore unable to contribute any more for the team. Although this never happened, hypothetically at least in Series 5 in the UK, if no keys were won in Phase One, it would have been impossible for the team to continue the game since in Series 5 in the UK five keys were needed to open the treasure room door, and since there are only five contestants, and no one can swim for the Captain's keys, every contestant would have to make a sacrifice for all five keys, leaving no contestants spare to get clue words to work out the code word and release the gold.

In the seasons of the French version from 2011 onward, if a team is short of keys, then team members could be 'sacrificed' by facing "Judgment" (Le Jugement), hosted by the character Blanche.  Each sacrificed team member would have to complete a challenge of skill or luck set by Blanche.  If the sacrificed team member was successful in his/her challenge, Blanche would grant him/her their freedom and would be able to rejoin the team.  However, if the team member fails the challenge, he or she would be sent to prison. Team members who were locked in during a Phase One challenge can also win their freedom by facing Blanche and succeeding at the proposed challenge.

If the team has more keys than necessary to unlock the gate then any extra keys gained can be swapped for free clue words to assist the team in the next phase of the game.

Challenges
From 1990 to 2014, there were 185 different events (key games). The name of the game may change, but the game itself usually remains the same; where possible, this list will use the names from Ultimate Challenge.

Note: This is NOT the full list of games that have been played. The years below are for when the game was played or last present at the fort, in the French version or Ultimate Challenge (some games are present but not played every year). A full list of games can be found here.

Here is a selection of some of these challenges:

New Games for 2011
 Visual Enigma (cell 112)

New Games for 2012
 Gagarin (cell 109) – A similar game, also using a gyroscope, was present on the fort between 1995 and 1997.
 Anvil (outside, between the fort and the platform)
 Balance (outside, between the fort and the platform)

New Games for 2013
 Cuisine de Willy (cell 215A) – First time this cell has been used since 1991. A new character, an Italian Chef, played by Willy Rovelli (a contestant in 2012) appears in the fort's kitchen. This cell is not used in international versions and is covered up.
 Père Fouras Show (cell 215B) – Replaced the Code Braille in French version, known as Creature Code in Ultimate Challenge. In the international versions, Creature Code is still present on the fort.

Note: Some clue games are also played as key games and vice versa.

Adventures/Ordeals
Once again in this part of the game the contestants have to complete a series of games, but instead of playing for keys they are playing for clue words. In addition, these games are more physically challenging to the contestants than those played in the challenges. Before these adventures, one contestant goes to the Watch Tower to try to win a clue word. The adventures last around 10–20 minutes long in the UK version, this depends on how long the team take to win the required number of keys needed to open the Treasure Room gate.

The objective in this phase is to try to figure out the codeword, which, if answered correctly, will release the gold. To do this, they must try to win clue words to help them in working out the codeword (password in the UK version).

These clue words can be placed either before or after the password to make a word or common phrase. For example: if the clues words were Hall and Line then the password would be DANCE, as in DANCE Hall and Line DANCE.

To make it even more difficult to get the clue word, a time limit (3 minutes usually; occasionally between 2:00–3:30 minutes) is placed on each game. The clue words are usually written on pieces of paper and kept in canisters filled with gunpowder, and if the contestant fails to reach the canister in the allotted time the clue word explodes and the contestant loses the challenge. Unlike the challenges, players are not locked in if they fail to win the clue word.

Adventures
From 1991 to 2011, there were 71 different adventures. This section details some of Fort Boyards most famous games. The name of the game may change from country-country; but the game itself remains the same (like in Phase One, where possible, names from Ultimate Challenge will be used). The years below are for when the game was played or last present at the fort, in the French version or Ultimate Challenge.

Examples of the clue games, also known as "ordeals" or "adventures", are:

New Games for 2011
 Stretcher (cell 212) – replaces Spiders and Scorpions
 Abandoned Cabin (cell 218 (2011), 216 (2012–)) – French Exclusive
 Immersed Cell
 Cell RecRec – previously Shrinking Cell
 Tanks (cell 209) – replaced by Cold Room in 2012
 Sewage (cell 118) – called Dark Descent in Ultimate Challenge
 Creature Count/Code (cell 215B) – called lotto in the French version
 Beam-jets

New Games for 2013
 Circle (outdoors, above courtyard) – Ring Run in Ultimate Challenge
 Submarine Training (outdoor, ground floor patio) – Pressure Tank in Ultimate Challenge
 Umbrellas (outdoors, above courtyard) – Balancing Brollies in Ultimate Challenge
 Vélibérateur (indoor basement, tank flooded) – Pedal Pump in Ultimate Challenge
 Hammocks (cell 115) (Duel)
 Underwater Balloons (Duel)
 Deadly Drop (Duel)

Note: Some of these games are still in place on the fort, but have not been played recently in the French version and others. Most of these games are listed by their Ultimate Challenge names. Not all of the clue games played have been mentioned above.

The Watch Tower

In the Watch Tower of the Fort lives a usually eccentric character that sets riddles for certain contestants; if the contestants give the correct answer within the time limit, they receive a key. In the case of the clue riddles, the answer to the riddle is the clue word, so even if the contestant does not solve it in the Watch Tower he or she can still think about it during the rest of the game. During the riddles, the contestant can keep guessing until the time (indicated by Jack or Jules holding up a sand timer) has elapsed. If the contestant fails to guess the correct answer within the time limit, the key is "thrown" into the sea, and another contestant has to swim for it. This was always won as the strongest swimmer would retrieve the key. The swim was removed in series 5 of the UK version, but was re-introduced in Ultimate Challenge as Key to the Sea (without the Watch Tower riddle).

Since 2006, the contestants can no longer swim for the key; it is just put back where it was held. The clue word is also different and is not the same as the riddle. Therefore, the riddle must be solved within the time limit to obtain the clue.

In the French version from 2011 to 2013, The Watch Tower wasn't used; instead, there were three trips to the Interactive Cell. The second trip was a Visual Riddle, about halfway through the key games, with Father Fouras on screen. The Clue Riddle is replaced by a telephone riddle where the player is in a booth inside one of the cells and has 1 minute to solve the riddle, given by Father Fouras over the phone, whilst cockroaches are dropped on top of them. This takes form of a game, called Abandoned Cabin, in the French version. The Watch Tower was however used in the 2012 Russian version of the show (the only country to use it that year) and in 2013 for the Azerbaijan, Canadian and Swedish versions.

The Treasure Room

The Treasure Room (or Treasure Chamber in Ultimate Challenge) is the climax to each episode of Fort Boyard. The gold is stored here, which is guarded by the fort's tigers.

Once the Fort's gong sounds for a second time, the game time is over. When the gong is struck (by La Boule) the tigers are taken away by Monique, the gate to the Treasure Room rises and will only stay open for the time won in the Council Duels (1:30 minimum, or 4:00 maximum in the French version), 2:00 minutes in UK series 1 to 4 (the time stated did not include the 20 seconds before the gate started to rise) or 3:00 minutes in UK series 5. The 3 minutes includes 20 seconds before the gate started to rise (to open canisters/organise team). The gate takes 30 seconds to open and close fully for every version of Fort Boyard worldwide.

As of 2016, in the French version, contestants who failed at the duels during the "judgment" sequence will have the chance to free themselves by making their way through an obstacle course within 2:30, with any time used in excess of 2:30 taken away from the three minutes the contestants have in the treasure room. This is then followed by extra games which are played to win extra time in the treasure room. Four or six members of the team each compete in a duel against the "Masters of Time". There is no risk of any time lost with 15 seconds earned for each successful duel, making a maximum possible time in the treasure room of four minutes.

If by this time the team has still not figured out the password from the clues won, they can "sacrifice" players in exchange for extra clues to help them. The sacrificed players have to grab the clue by putting their hand into one of the tiger-shaped hand traps around the Treasure Room entrance; once their hands are inside, they cannot release them and participate in collecting the gold.

The contestants then have to spell out the password on the giant alphabet on the floor of the treasure room by standing on the corresponding letters on the grid and using cannonballs if there are not enough players. The team must also ensure the word is spelled correctly, as a mistake could cost them the prize.

Once this is done, Monique/Felindra rotates the tiger's head (a statue), and the word will either be declared correct or incorrect, and the gold is released if the word is correct. Then the contestants have the remaining time to collect as much gold as they can and place it in a bucket outside of the treasure room. It is only what is in this bucket that they get to keep; any that lands on the floor is not counted. When the time is nearly up in the treasure room, a bell rings (in the UK version, in other versions the bell would have to be rung manually), and the gate begins to close slowly. The contestants have to leave before the gate shuts completely because when the door shuts the tigers are released back into the treasure room. (the release of the tigers is delayed until the contestants are out of the treasure room, a portcullis is pulled in some versions to block the tigers from being released). In the 1990 French version, and in the 2006 Russian version of the show, contestants were "locked" in the treasure room. On the second occasion, the gold collected was lost as a result.

If, however, they declare an incorrect word, the gold is not released and instead the gate to the treasure room begins to close immediately, prompting the contestants to make a quick escape, and they complete the game with no winnings.

The won gold is then weighed and converted into local currency; this makes the contestants' prize money. In most countries, the money won by the team is given to a charity. Some countries, including Spain, Argentina, the UK, and Belgium, give the money directly to the members of the team. Some give vacations instead of money, dependent on how much the team won. In France, between 1990 and 1992, the treasure was given to the team, but since 1993, the whole prize goes to charity. Then again in 2010, the prize money was given to the contestants.

Summary of the UK rules

Note: Opening titles shown the original series (1–3) boat, and did not actually show the 2003 remake series arriving outside the Fort.

Broadcast

UK transmissions
In total, 57 episodes were shown in the original Channel 5 series; including four celebrity specials and a special edition with contestants from the first UK series of The Mole.

On 1 July 2014, Challenge announced on social media that they had re-acquired all the Channel 5 years of the show (previously repeated by the channel from 2002 to 2006) and would begin airing series 1–2 in August that year, with series 3 and 4 following in 2015. Series 1 started on 4 August at 5 pm, followed by series 2 on 18 August 2014. Series 3 starts on 7 May 2015 at 6 pm.

Regular series

Celebrity specials

Takes on the World

Technical details
From a broadcasting perspective, Fort Boyard itself was refurbished during 1988–89 to become, essentially, a large outdoor television studio. The Fort has its own doctor, catering facilities, as well as production gallery and veterinary centre.

The Fort is equipped with 10 portable television cameras, one camera crane for overhead shots, one under-water camera as well as a number of smaller cameras which specifically cover individual games and challenges around the Fort.

The show was originally produced in the 4:3 aspect ratio, and changed to the 16:9 widescreen aspect ratio from 2008, and in HD since 2013.

Variations to the format
In 1996, at the height of the French version's popularity, a mini-series entitled Fort Boyard at Night was shown in the autumn. It was filmed entirely at night, and the teams also had slightly more time in which to complete the challenges. In 1997, there were three night-time specials, at Halloween, Christmas, and New Year. In 2012, three further night-time editions were filmed and aired between Halloween (31 October) and Christmas (22 and 29 December).

In some of the French (Seasons 14–16, 2003–2005) and Russian versions (2003–2004), the contestants stay overnight in the Fortress. During this time, they played endurance, mind, and psychological games both for the release of any prisoners they may have had, and for keys to, or time in, the Treasure Room at the end of the game.

Although most seasons have seen changes (not least in hosts), recent changes to the French version of Fort Boyard included:

 From 2006 to 2009, the number of keys determined how much access the team had to the Treasure Room. 5 keys were the minimum needed to open the gate, but the gate would only open to a certain height, which made carrying coins through the gate difficult. A 6th key would open the gate roughly halfway, but it was still not easy to get through. To open the gate fully, 7 keys were needed. In 2006, when the host pulls the switch the Treasure Room gate would start to open immediately. If a team member did not get out of the Treasure Room in time, a portcullis was activated which stopped the tigers, but the money collected was lost forever.

The Council
 In the council, teams no longer play to free prisoners; rather, they play for up to 60 extra seconds of extra time in the Treasure Room, in addition to the three minutes guaranteed. From 1995 to 2011, there were a total of 31 different council games.

Hall of Imprints
 There was a new section in which one member donned a diving suit and dived down to the underwater control centre. There, he or she was guided by the team through an underground passage filled with traps and coded doors towards the "Hall of Imprints", freeing their prisoners along the way. Once all members (except the diver) had reached the Hall, they used their right hands to release the crystal, which they needed to enter the council.

2007 season
 The Duels: They have extra games which are played to win extra time in The Treasure Room. Four members of the team play a game each against the Master of Darkness, if they won they got 15 seconds each, a total of 1 minute, of extra time in the Treasure room, making it a full 4 minutes.
The Treasure Room: 2007 was the only season the time in the Treasure Room started at the opening of the gate. The team had 3:00–4:00 minutes from when the host pulled the switch to open the gate. The team also had  15 seconds (if they had 6 keys) or 25 seconds (if they had 7 keys) before the start of the time; this made the time actually 3:00 to 4:25 minutes in total.

2008 season
 In 2008, the diving section changed. All members except the diver entered the control centre. They had to put 9 coloured cubes in the correct order, using clues provided by the host. Once the 9 cubes are in place, the trap door for the diver opened. The diver entered a flooded room, with a treasure box, a drawing, and a maze with various coloured keys in it. He or she has had to describe the small drawing to the other team members. The drawing corresponds to a drawing on one of the 9 coloured cubes. The colour of the matching cube determined the key to retrieve from the maze. The team members had to guide the diver through the maze, as the diver only see it from behind. After the key had been freed, it was used to unchain the treasure box. The box was then lifted from the water, but couldn't be opened yet. The key to open it was inside the Treasure Room and would fall down together with the gold.

2009 season
2009 saw many more changes. Main changes included new opening titles, graphics and a wall of progress which Demi (Passe Muraille) was in control of which lined the wall of the Fort (the wall above the Treasure Room). There were 6 new key games and 2 new clue games in 2009. 
One of the first major changes on the Fort was the before game challenge, called The Tube, which was only used this season. There was a large tube full of coloured water. The team had to find 2 black scratching posts, situated around the Fort, to find the numbers which was the combination to unlock the box containing the cup which was connected to the tube . If they could fill the cup with water before the tube ran out they got a bonus key game after the 45:00 minutes of key games had finished. This game was played in the central circle before the gong.
 Another change was that teams no longer stopped collecting keys at 7 keys but could continue on to collect up to 10 keys. These extra 3 keys were exchanged for clue words at the Treasure Room.
 Extra Games: The middle section of the game was also different. There were now 3 boxes which contained money. The problem was that 2 of them were sealed with glass. During this the prisoners would play Fear Factor style games in an attempt to win "pieces" to eliminate colours. The prisoners were released but if they did not win their games they were not allowed inside the Treasure Room.
 The Duels: Duels were different in 2009. The team could see what was happening through a window. The starting time was 3:00, but the team needed to bet on the duels with time. These times were 30, 20, 10, and −15 seconds. If they win on −15 seconds they did not lose any time. This made the minimum time in the Treasure Room 2:45, with the maximum being a full 4:00 minutes.
 The Treasure Room: The Treasure Room had changed in 2009. Firstly, the 6 key sign was raised to shoulder height. Secondly, teams couldn't trade clues for extra keys; they had to play with the keys they had. (If they got under 5 keys someone was sacrificed to Mr. Chan to gain a key.) In the Treasure Room they collected keys for boxes containing extra gold. They were allowed to pick only one box, at the end, and were allowed as many keys as there were people in the Treasure Room. Picking the correct box earned the team the extra gold.

Duel format
Since 2003, a duel/tournament format has been used by other countries, who prefer this version of Fort Boyard. Two teams play in the Fort at the same time, with only one of them winning at the end. A similar format was used in 1991.

In 2007 and 2008, a formula with duels between three countries (Bulgaria, Serbia and Turkey) was used; two countries (Belgium and Netherlands) in 1991 and with teams of teenagers in 2011 (United Kingdom and United States).

Countries that have used this format include:

 Azerbaijan (2013–2014)
 Belgium (1991)
 Bulgaria (2007–2008)
 Canada (2013–2014)
 Denmark (2009–2010, 2019, 2021)
 Finland (2010, 2012, 2018–2019)
 France (2010)
 Germany (2010)
 Greece (2006–2008)
 Netherlands (1991, 2011–2012, 2014)
 Norway (2010–2011, 2021)
 Poland (2021)
 Russia (2006, 2012)
 Serbia (2007–2008)
 Sweden (2003–2004, 2010–17, 2019)
 Turkey (2007–2008)
 United Kingdom (2011–2014)
 United States (1991 pilot, 2011)

French version
In 2010, the duel format was introduced to the show following the low ratings for the previous season in 2009. Although, this was not successful in the French version and was later dropped the same year. The show returned to a more classical version in 2011.

The changes made to the French version in 2010 were:

Main overview
 Passe-Temps and Mr. Chan left the show.
 Olivier Minne became the only host.
 Two teams competed to try to win the most keys in the first section.

Game Play
 12 teams of 4 play 2 sections of the game. The Special team play only section 2 in game of episode 1 because all 4 members are former contestants in Fort Boyard.
 The team who won were called the "champion team" and would return the following week. Until the last episode, the Special team would play as the "normal team".
 Key games not only included the ones inside cells but also the clue games, which were played against a clepsydre. If the team lost a clue game they were made prisoner.
 There were 3 rounds of key games. Before each round there was a duel. Winning the duel not only won them a key, but also meant the other team had to win their game or their player was automatically made a prisoner.
 If there is no clear winner after the 3 rounds a new section of the show, Crossbow Relay, was introduced. Before this, the prisoners were released. All members had to complete a relay course for keys.
 The team with the lowest number of keys was sent off the Fort and a new team (champion team from last week) was sent back to compete against the current champions.
 The champion team from the last episode then faced the round 1 winners in clue games. These clue games can be key games with clue canisters, or clue games which were against the clepsydre.
 There were three rounds of clue games, with each round starting with a duel. Again the losing team was made prisoner if they did not win their clue game, but the winning team also got to choose which team got to play which game.
 After the clue rounds, any prisoners were released by the duels in the council room. 2/3 was required to win.
The Treasure Room
 At the Treasure Room, both teams used their clues and wrote down the codeword on a slate. Once this was put in place they had the remaining time of 3:30 (which included working out the code word). After 1 minute the gate started to open and began closes after 3:00 minutes (took 30 seconds to close fully). At around 0:15 seconds the slots were closed so the team couldn't insert any more money.
 The gold was then weighed and the codes were revealed. The team with the highest gold and correct codeword won.
 If both teams had the correct code, the team with the highest weight of gold won €10,000 and returned the following week.
 If both teams had the incorrect code, the champion team would return the following week, but did not win €10,000.
 The team which won the Grand Final (episode 7) would receive €50,000 prize (includes the €10,000 won previously).

2010 German changes
 Most of the show's characters are gone.
 The Watch Tower and the riddles have been removed.
 The duel/tournament format was used.

2011 French changes
Main overview

 Olivier Minne continues as the only host.
 Return to a more "classic" format, one team and seven keys required. (45 mins of key games, 25 mins for the adventures)
 Return of celebrities playing for charity.
 3 new characters, including the return of the mud wrestler (Lady Boo).
 Father Fouras now chairs the council.

The Duels
 The team can see what is happening in the Council through a window. The starting time is 3:00, but the team must bet on the duels with this time. The times are 20, 15, 15 and 10 seconds. If they win on their choosing time it will be added to the 3:00 minutes, but if they lose it will be deducted. This makes the minimum time in the Treasure Room 2:00, with the maximum being a full 4:00.

The Hall of Judgement

This takes place after the key games. The Hall of Judgement provides opportunities for candidates to obtain the missing keys against the sacrifice of one of them but also to free the team members locked in during the first half. The challenges are set by new female character, the White Judge; played by Louise-Marie Hustings in 2011, then Raphaëlle Lenoble during 2012, and Delphine Wespiser since 2013 (who was a contestant at Halloween 2012). The challenges used are similar to those on The Cube and Minute to Win It.

 Each team member is free to be sacrificed to receive an extra key. The White Judge, sets a challenge the sacrifice/prisoner must complete to be released. If failed, they go directly into the terrible jails of La Boule until the end of the show; if they succeed, however, they are released and return to their team.

The Treasure Room
 When the host pulls the switch, the Treasure Room gate will start to open immediately. This was also done in 2006.
 The team have 12 seconds to process the password, instead of the normal 15 seconds.

2011 UK changes

Main overview
 The show is now called Fort Boyard: Ultimate Challenge.
 Laura Hamilton and Andy Akinwolere, previously Geno Segers, present the new series.
 Teams are made-up of teenagers aged between 13 and 19 years old.
 The show's characters are gone and until series 4, the tigers were not used.
 The teams only collect keys and the Treasure Room section is changed.

2012 French changes
 The Duels: The times are 20, 15 and 10 seconds. If they win on their choosing time it will be added to the 3:00 minutes, but if they lose it will be deducted. This makes the minimum time in the Treasure Room 2:15, with the maximum being 3:45 if all bets are won. The second duel is now a word puzzle rather than a contest with the Master of Shadows.

2014 French changes
 The Duels: The times are 10 seconds for three games and 30 seconds for two games. If they win on their choosing time it will be added to the 3:00 minutes, but if they lose it will be deducted. This makes the minimum time in the Treasure Room 1:30, with the maximum being 4:30 if all bets are won. The prisoners will be released with 15 seconds deducted for each player.

2015 French changes
 The Cage: A new area was added, called The Cage, and is hosted by the character Rouge, the twin sister of Blanche. This happens at the 25-minute mark in part 1. The team must sacrifice 1 key to enter The Cage, where three of the team members will compete in individual games against one of the Fort's guards, the guards were a team of former attendees chosen by Rouge. Each challenge completed successfully adds a key to the team's total, meaning if all 3 team members win their games, the net profit is 2 keys. Since 2016, teams are no longer required to sacrifice a key to enter The Cage.
 Prisoner Escape: Prisoners are now allowed to escape after Part 2, completing a course to get out of prison. The prisoner has 1:30 to escape, and any additional time taken is deducted from the team's starting 2:00 in the Treasure Room.
 The Duels: Duels no longer deduct from the team's Treasure Room time, they only add time depending on the team member's performance in the duel. This includes a new clock for Father Fouras' riddle, which is divided into three sections, 30, 20, and 10 seconds. Should the team member solve the riddle in time, the amount of time added is determined by the section the clock pointer is in, meaning the riddle is worth less time the longer it takes to solve it.

2016 French changes
 The Duels: The duels return to the original head-to-head format with a candidate verses a tiger council master, 4 candidates get picked to play the duels, each duel challenged and completed adds 15 seconds to the timer, for a possible maximum time of 4 minutes on the clock, depending if the escape hasn't taken time away from the Treasure Room clock before hand.

2018 French changes
 The Cage: The cage duels had changed from having a set of alumni, as part of a story shift, Rouge picked up some lost children and decided to make them into an elite squad just like the alumni beforehand. The same rules apply here, three duels to win three keys.

2020 French changes
As of 2020, COVID-19 had caused a few changes to the 2020 series of Fort Boyard. Some safety measures were in place to keep the candidates safe on the fortress which also changed the format of the series.

 The Team: As of the 2020 series, due to COVID-19 the amount of team members were reduced back to 5 members in the team. As part of the safety precautions, the team are based down in the bottom floor of the Fort within the treasure room entrance. Once entering the Fort, they wear facemasks and are spaced out equally at 1 meter apart. The command center for the adventures is all set in one safe area. They also mask up once inside the Treasure Room.
 Key Games and Adventures: Rather than the team being guided around the Fort, instead Passe-Partout would bring the players to the rooms and challenges while Passe-Muraille as usual would be Father Fouras's messenger boy passing scrolls to Olivier for each key game and adventure. Most two player games how now been reduced to one player games within the Fort to prevent COVID-19 spreading. For this series, the amount of keys have been reduced to 8 keys in the allotted time limit of 50 minutes.
 The Cage: This season, the cage does not bring back the lost children warriors, this time it features only three defenders for the game. Lady Boo, Little Boo and a replacement for Mr Boo, Big Boo. However the rules stay the same. Three rounds against the cage defenders to win a maximum of 3 keys, one for each round if completed successfully. Rather than the team going into the cage itself, the candidates chosen are brought there by Passe-Partout.
 The Escape: This season, before the escape, the team are given 3 minutes of time for the Treasure Room, if there are prisoners the escape has a time limit of 2:30. The candidates who get imprisoned must escape within that time. Once the initial time is over, the clock goes into overtime, in overtime it removes time from the Treasure room and will not stop until the candidates flip a switch to stop the clock once they have escaped.
 The Duels: The duels stay the same, 4 candidates take part in the duels to earn 15 seconds per duel win for a maximum of 4 minutes, however for safety concerns, it is broken down that two members of the team head into the tiger council at a time as they enter one by one afterwards for safety reasons.

2021 French changes
Willy Rovelli: As of the 2021 season of the show, Willy Rovelli had been captured by Pere Fouras after his Speakeasy bar had been found, as punishment he was placed inside the Fort Prison for his crimes. He usually will be inside the fort with the locked in team mates as he makes them do two events. WillyMation and Prison Canteen. In WillyMaton, the locked in players are to take on a small task. Taking a mug shot, however they must be perfectly still while distractions happen around them. If they fail to take a still photo three times the team member is locked in the prison for the adventures. For those locked in the prison, the team members then would take on the Prison Canteen, taking on the prison canteen the locked in team members must consume a food item to not only be freed but also to keep the treasure room time safe.

2022 French changes
The Tigers: This year saw the end of the Tigers being on the fort as they were replaced with models and CGI versions of the tigers.
The Team: As of the 2022 series, the teams have returned to the maximum of 6 members on a team, with the team being able to travel around the fortress without the need for facemasks or social distancing.
Key Games and Adventures: This year, as part of the changes, the series had been given a few format for the entire season. Each episode for the 2022 season Pere Fouras had set up a new stipulation system, ranging from a Night of Restrictions, or The Solo Adventure, which lasts throughout the night on the fort. The key games had been returned to a time limit of 45 minutes and with a key limit of 7 keys to collect.
Willy Rovelli: As of the 2021 season of the show, Willy Rovelli had been captured by Pere Fouras after his Speakeasy bar had been found, as punishment he was placed inside the Fort Prison for his crimes. He usually will be inside the fort with the locked in team mates as he makes them do two events. WillyMation and Willy's Canteen. In WillyMaton, the locked in players are to take on a small task. Taking a mug shot, however they must be perfectly still while
Judgement: For the judement part of the show, the series has changed the feature so that now sisters Rouge and Blanche now share the power of judgement. With the Cage now apart of the judgement it follows the same rules that if a player loses the cage judgement they are to be locked away.
Willy Rovelli: As of the 2022 season of the show, Willy Rovelli has gone from being a prisoner of the fort to being a Deputy of the Fort Prison.

Music
The music for the original French version of Fort Boyard was composed by Paul Koulak, a French music composer. He composed the main themes for the show as well as the incidental music and game music that is used throughout the show. His music has been used for every version of Fort Boyard around the world, except the German version, where they composed their own music for the show and games.

Up to 2017, seven different opening theme songs have been used on the show; the first was used until 1994, the second in 1995, the third from 1996 to 2000, the fourth in 2001 and 2002 (used by the UK in 2003 during the Treasure Room), the "Dance Version" (used by France during the end credits of the night editions in 1996 and the UK from 1999 to 2001), the sixth theme song which was introduced in the 2003 French version and the seventh, introduced in 2016. Fort Boyard Ultimate Challenge uses a different opening theme and game music composed by Paul Farrer but does use the recent French opening credits and logo.

Fort Boyard: Takes On The World
Broadcast in October 2004 by Challenge, Fort Boyard: Takes On The World was a ten-part documentary which introduced British viewers to various different versions of the show from around the world. Comedian and former contestant Tim Vine provided the voiceover. The show was split into sections including "The Good, The Bad and The Ugly", "Heroes and Zeroes" and "The A-Z of Fort Boyard". There were also interviews with various characters of the Fort (with the humour provided by the fact that Tim cannot speak French and the characters cannot speak English).

Merchandise

CD releases
Some of the original music for Fort Boyard was released on CD in France, both on CD single and CD album form, in 1996 and again in July 1999 as Fort Boyard: La Musique de Toutes Les Aventures.

Single

Album

Comic adaptations

Video games

Fort Boyard: Le Défi is a PC CD-ROM game based on the television show and released in 1995. It provides the player the possibility to become a team member, playing the well known game in the Fort. The game was created by Microids, France Televisions and R&P Electronic Media. The game was available in French and Dutch.

Fort Boyard: La Legende is an action adventure game, based in and around La Rochelle and on Fort Boyard. It was released in 1996 by Expand Images, Microïds, France Télévisions, and R&P Electronic Media. It was only released in the original French version (as a tie-in to the game show) and the later Dutch-spoken versions. The lack of an English version made this game highly obscure: it does not have a MobyGames entry. The hero of this game has no name; he is going to look for a treasure that was hidden by Napoleon at Fort Boyard. For this he needs to look around for clues, and get people to help, in and around La Rochelle.

References

Bibliography

External links

 (French series)

France Télévisions original programming
French game shows
1990 French television series debuts
1990s French television series
2000s French television series
2010s French television series
1993 Canadian television series debuts
2015 Canadian television series endings
1990s Canadian game shows
2000s Canadian game shows
2010s Canadian game shows
Channel 5 (British TV channel) original programming
1998 British television series debuts
2003 British television series endings
1990s British game shows
2000s British game shows
British television series revived after cancellation
Television series by Reg Grundy Productions
Television shows produced by Thames Television
Television series by Fremantle (company)
Television series by Banijay
Television shows set in France
Television franchises
Television shows adapted into comics
TVA (Canadian TV network) original programming